21st Fortune is the fourth (third of entirely new music) solo album released by Daisuke Asakura on September 19, 2002.

Track listing
All songs produced by Daisuke Asakura
All vocals & lyrics by Daisuke Asakura

References
 Official Daisuke Asakura Discography

2002 albums
Daisuke Asakura albums